The Municipal Council of Istanbul (Turkish: İstanbul Büyükşehir Belediye Meclisi) is the decision-making organ of the Istanbul Metropolitan Municipality. The council has decision making authority on most municipal matters with the exception of transport policy, which is handled by the Transport Coordination Center (turkish: UKOME, Ulaşım Koordinasyon Müdürlüğü). The council, unlike other assemblies, cannot change its own rules of procedure, as these are set nationwide with the laws numbered 5216 and 5393 on Metropolitan Municipalities and Municipalities respectively.

Structure 
There are no separate elections held for the Metropolitan Municipal Council, the body comprises elected councillors from district municipal councils (Turkish: İlçe Belediye Meclisleri) of Istanbul. After local elections, one fifth of the elected district councillors are chosen to also represent their district in the metropolitan council. District mayors are considered "natural members" of the metrpolitan municipal council, and thus are not counted in the one-fifth calculation. The elected metropolitan mayor serves as the President of the council until their term ends, and can exercise their veto power to send decisions back to deliberation. Decisions vetoed still only need a simple majority to pass again. The council meets every second week of the month on a day previosuly decided by the council. The mayor decides on a meeting day if no such day was agreed upon by the council beforehand.

References

Government of Istanbul